The 2020 Coastal Carolina Chanticleers men's soccer team represented Coastal Carolina University during the 2020 NCAA Division I men's soccer season and the 2020 Sun Belt Conference men's soccer season. The regular season was initially scheduled to begin on August 28 and concluded on November 6. Due to the COVID-19 pandemic, the regular season start was delayed to September 18, with Coastal Carolina playing their first game on October 10. It was the program's 43rd season fielding a men's varsity soccer team, and their 5th season in the Sun Belt. The 200 2season was Shaun Docking's 23rd year as head coach for the program. Assistant coaches Oliver Slawson and Chris Fidler were in their first year as assistant coaches.

Coastal Carolina had one of their more successful conference seasons, winning their third Sun Belt regular season championship and fourth Sun Belt Tournament championship. It was the Chanticleer's 14th overall conference regular season championship, and 16th overall tournament championship, including their history in the Sun Belt and Big South Conference.

Background

Team management 

|-
!colspan="2" style= | Front office
|-

|- 
!colspan="2" style= | Coaching staff
|-

Roster 
Updated November 16, 2020

Player movement

Departures

Arrivals

Recruits

Transfers

Competitions

Sun Belt regular season

Sun Belt Tournament

Spring 2021 season

NCAA Tournament

Statistics

Appearances and goals

Numbers after plus–sign (+) denote appearances as a substitute.

Top scorers

Top assists

Disciplinary record

References 

2020
Coastal Carolina Chanticleers
Coastal Carolina Chanticleers
Coastal Carolina Chanticleers men's soccer
2020 NCAA Division I Men's Soccer Tournament participants